is a Japanese gravure idol. She is from Tokyo, and belongs to the show-business production Suns Entertainment. She belonged to Yellow Cab before 2004. She portrayed the hostess who became a nun named Saori in Lion-Maru G.

Career 
Kobayashi graduated from Aoyama Gakuin Senior High School. As a freshman there, she was in the swimming club. She later earned a degree in management at Aoyama Gakuin University. When she belonged to Yellow Cab Kobayashi was a member of R.C.T. She was a defender for the futsal team Carezza, having uniform number 3.

Activities

TV Programs 
 Kyabutomushi, Chubu-Nippon Broadcasting
 Odaiba-kei Bikini de Manyumanyu, Fuji Satellite Broadcasting
 R# Room Number, TV Asahi 2003 R#216
 Papa ni Onedari
 Naku Hi
 Dokushin 3!!, TV Asahi 2003
 Hiroshi Sekiguchi no Friend Park II, TBS 2003-04
 Ken Shimura no Baka-tonosama, Fuji Television 2003
 Takajin no soko made Itte Iinkai, YTV
 Akko ni Omakase!, TBS
 Zettai Tsukaeru Drive Tour 3, NTV 2005
 Jichael Mackson, MBS 2005
 Uchimura Produce, TV Asahi 2005
 Quiz Presen' Variety Q-sama!!, TV Asahi 2005, 2006
 Mecha-Mecha Iketeru!, Fuji Television 2006
 Quiz! Hexagon II, Fuji Television 2006
 Do-tanki Tsumekomi Kyoiku! Gowan! Coaching!!, TV Tokyo 2006
 Konya mo Doll-bako!! R, TV Tokyo 2006
 KICK IN! GAROTAS FUTSAL TV, Fuji Satellite Broadcasting
 FNS 26 Jikan TV Kokumintekina Omoshirosa! Shijo Saidai!! Manatsu no Quiz Matsuri 26 Jikan Buttoshi Special "Hijoshiki wa Bishonure! Asa made Nep-league SP" 2006
 Saishu Keikoku! Takeshi no Hontou wa Kowai Katei no Igaku, ABC
 Lion-Maru G, TV Tokyo 2006
 Roshiago Kaiwa, NHK E 2007-

Bibliography

Photobooks 
 , Aqua House 2002
 AI, Compass 2002
 HAPPENING, Takeshobo 2003
 umiemi, Ongakusenkasha 2005
 , Shinchosha 2006

External links 
 Suns Entertainment 
 Profile of Emi Kobayashi 

 "Monthly Charger" Idol Interview Vol.4: Emi Kobayashi  - In October 2005

1983 births
Japanese gravure models
Japanese idols
Japanese actresses
Japanese television personalities
Living people
People from Tokyo
Aoyama Gakuin University alumni